Buche Nangal is a village located in Punjab state, India, near Kalanaur. The name is derived from a past chieftain of the town, who lost his ear in a Battle. He thus was a bucha (Punjabi: one-eared man). The name changed over time to Buche Nangal (a term for a municipal council).

History 
The Name Of Village Chieftain was "Ram Singh". He was Jarnail (General) of Maharaja Ranjit Singh's Misl (Sukerchakia Misl). The Peoples of Village moved From Chittorgarh (Now Fathegarh Churrian, Punjab) and settled in the Buche Nangal land because their population was not increasing, and they believed that this problem was due to the area where they were previously settled. Initially the Village was named "Ram Nagar" after its Chief, Ram Singh. When Ram Singh lost his ear in a Battle fought as part of the forces of the Sukerchakia Misl under Maharaja Ranjit Singh the name was with time changed to Buche Nangal.

Demographics 
The population is primarily Punjabi, with the local economy based on agriculture. Wheat, rice, and sugar cane are widely grown in the area. Peoples who live here are Bandesha most of them are jatts. In Buche Nangal village population of children with age (0-6) is 96 which makes up 13.45% of total population of village. Average Sex ratio of Buche Nangal village is 1000 which is higher than Punjab state average of 895. Child Sex Ratio for the Buche Nangal as per census is 714, lower than Punjab average of 846. Buche Nangal village has lower literacy rate compared to Punjab. In 2011, literacy rate of Buche Nangal village was 67.64% compared to 75.84% of Punjab. In Buche Nangal Male literacy stands at 73.09% while female literacy rate was 62.46%. As per constitution of India and Panchyati Raaj Act, Buche Nangal village is administrated by a Sarpanch (Head of Village) who is an elected representative of the village.

Geography 
Buche Nangal is a village panchayat located in the Gurdaspur district of Punjab state, India. The latitude 31.9826039 and longitude 75.2201933 are the geocoordinate of the Buche Nangal. Chandigarh is the state capital for Buche Nangal village . It is located around 201.8 kilometer away from Buche Nangal. The other nearest state capital from Buche Nangal is Chandigarh and its distance is 201.8 km. The other surrounding state capitals are Chandigarh 201.8 km., Shimla 
207.9 km., Srinagar 237.7 km.

Commerce

Development and Sources 
 Electricity Power Sub-Station (66K.V)
 Wheat & Rice Trading Market
 Government Agriculture Society (Fertilizer & Seeds Supplier Stock)
 Sub Post Office
Rice Mill Factory

Healthcare

Health Services For Human Being & Animals 
 Dispensary 
 Veterinary Hospital 
 Doctor 
 Medicine Shop

Education

School 
 Government Primary School

Photos of village

External links
District Gurdaspur
Progress

66k.v Power Station inauguration by honorable Punjab's C.M Sardar Parkash Singh Badal

Villages in Gurdaspur district